The England cricket team represents England and Wales in Test cricket; until 1992, they also incorporated Scotland. Between 1990 and 2004, England played 172 Test matches, resulting in 58 victories, 53 draws and 61 defeats. They faced both Bangladesh and Zimbabwe for the first time in Test cricket during this period, and also played South Africa for the first time in almost 30 years after their apartheid-era sporting boycott was lifted. The period includes what is often described as the England cricket team's lowest point: when they fell to the bottom of the ICC Test rankings in 1999.

England faced the West Indies most frequently during this period—playing 39 matches against them—closely followed by 37 matches against Australia. England won more matches than they lost against Bangladesh, New Zealand, Sri Lanka, the West Indies and Zimbabwe. Against South Africa they won seven and lost seven, while they had losing records against Australia, India and Pakistan. England won nine matches by an innings, with their largest  victory being by an innings and 209 runs against Zimbabwe in 2000. They won by ten wickets three times during this period, and their largest victory by runs alone was against Bangladesh in 2003–04, whom they beat by 329 runs. Conversely, England suffered their third-largest ever defeat by an innings, losing to Sri Lanka by an innings and 215 runs during their tour there in 2003–04. Overall, England lost by an innings 20 times between 1990 and 2004.

Key

Matches

Summary

Notes

References

England in international cricket
England Test
Test